Neelin High School is a high school in Brandon, Manitoba, Canada. Its French name is "L'École secondaire Neelin." The school is public and funded by the province.

History
Neelin Composite High School opened in January 1957. The school was named after Thomas Addison Neelin, the Superintendent of the Brandon Schools from 1924 to 1950. Comp. High, as it came to be known, offered an academic program of studies along with Industrial Vocational, Business Education and Occupational Entrance Courses. The school motto Cum Manu et Capite (With Hand and Mind) reflects this early program mix. The school functioned as a composite high school until 1974, when the Industrial Vocational, Business Education, and Occupational Entrance courses were transferred over to Crocus Plains Regional Secondary School. Composite, was shortly thereafter removed from the title of the school, leaving T.A. Neelin High School. Through the ensuing years it has come to be known as Neelin High School, or more simply, Neelin.

Programs
It offers programs in both French immersion and English. Neelin High School has offered an IB Diploma Programme since May 2006 in addition to a regular program in Life Skills-Based Education. Neelin High School has a choir program consisting of four choirs, all under the conduction of Ms. Carolyn Gwyer. Neelin's sports teams are known as the "Neelin Spartans".

External links
Neelin High School 
International Baccalaureate Organization

Education in Brandon, Manitoba
Buildings and structures in Brandon, Manitoba
Educational institutions established in 1957
High schools in Manitoba
International Baccalaureate schools in Manitoba
1957 establishments in Manitoba